High Synagogue may refer to:
 High Synagogue (Kraków)
 High Synagogue (Prague)